Johannes Enschedé III (7 March 1785 in Haarlem – 8 October 1866 in Haarlem) was a Haarlem newspaper editor and printer.

Biography
He was the great grandson of the founder of the Joh. Enschedé company, and the oldest son of Johannes Enschedé Jr. Like his father and grandfather before him, he was a member of the Dutch Society of Science and the Teylers Second Society. He studied law in Leiden and returned to become partner in the family company at the young age of 20, where he became editor of the Opregte Haarlemsche Courant. On 25 March 1810 he married Catharina Hillegonda van Walré, (Haarlem, 16 August 1791 - Haarlem, 18 December 1845) the daughter of Jan van Walré and Maria Kops. From this marriage was born on 20 November 1811 a son, Johannes Enschedé IV.

Like his father, he was a regent of the St. Elizabeth's-Gasthuis and the Hofje van Staats en Noblet. Johannes Enschedé III was judge of instruction, Auditor soldier, a member of the Municipal Council and member of the House of Representatives (Netherlands).

Enschedé III continued his father's collection of art and books, but after his death these were auctioned by his heirs, much to the disappointment of his nephew Adriaan Justus Enschedé, who bought as much of the collection as he could.

References

 Het huis Enschedé 1703–1953, Joh. Enschedé en Zonen, Haarlem 1953
 Enschede aan het Klokhuisplein, (Dutch), by Just Enschede, De Vrieseborch, Haarlem, 1991, 
 Catalogue de la bibliothèque (manuscrits, ouvrages xylographiques, incunables, ouvrages d'estampes, livres curieux et rares) formée pendant le 18e siècle par Messieurs Izaak, Iohannes et le Dr. Iohannes Enschedé, sale catalog for the auction of Enschedé III's collection by Frederik Muller and Martinus Nijhoff, 9 December 1867; version on Google books

Members of Teylers Tweede Genootschap
1785 births
1866 deaths
People from Haarlem
Dutch businesspeople
Dutch art collectors
Bibliophiles
Dutch printers
Dutch newspaper editors
Members of the Koninklijke Hollandsche Maatschappij der Wetenschappen